Saint-Maurice-de-Cazevieille is a commune in the Gard department in southern France.

Population

See also
Communes of the Gard department

References
Saint-Maurice-de-Cazevieille - Official website of the municipality (in French) 

Communes of Gard